The 2020–21 Odense Boldklub season is the club's 132nd season, and their 59th appearance in the Danish Superliga. As well as the Superliga, the side also competed in Danish Cup, being eliminated by Midtjylland at the quarter-final stage.

First team

Last updated on 29 April 2021

Transfers and loans

In

Loans in

Loans out

New contracts

Friendlies

Pre-season

Competitions

Superliga

League table

Results summary

Results by round

Matches

Relegation round

Danish Cup

Squad statistics

Goalscorers
Includes all competitive matches. The list is sorted by shirt number when total goals are equal.

Disciplinary record

References

Odense Boldklub
Odense Boldklub seasons